Sunita Gowariker (née Mukherjee) is an Indian model and film producer.

Biography
Sunita Gowariker was born in India. Her father Deb Mukherjee and mother Manisha both were actors. Her younger brother, director Ayan Mukerji is from Deb's second marriage to a lady named Amrit.

Sunita graduated from Mithibai College with a Bachelor's degree in psychology with honours. After Gowariker worked briefly as a model for brands like Suhana cooking oil, Nycil prickly heat powder, Promise toothpaste and Frootie, she did a short stint with Air India as an air hostess before deciding to devote her entire time to her family.

Personal life
She is married to Indian film director Ashutosh Gowarikar. The couple has two sons named Konark Gowariker and Vishwang Gowariker.She is also the sister of Indian film director Ayan Mukerji.

Filmography

Producer
 Mohenjo Daro (2016)
 Khelein Hum Jee Jaan Sey (2010)
 What's Your Raashee? (2009)
 Jodhaa Akbar (2008)
 Swades (2004, executive producer - as Sunita A. Gowariker)

References

External links

Living people
Indian women film producers
Female models from Mumbai
Mithibai College alumni
Businesswomen from Maharashtra
Year of birth missing (living people)